Lava Lake may refer to:

 Lava Lake (Oregon)
 Lava Lake (British Columbia)
 Lava Lakes
 Little Lava Lake

See also
 Lava lake, a lake of molten or solidified lava